Thomas van den Houten (born 20 July 1990) is a Dutch former professional footballer player who played as a left back.

Club career
He made his professional debut in the Eerste Divisie for SC Telstar on 10 August 2015 in a game against RKC Waalwijk.

On 6 January 2020, van den Houten signed a deal with SV Spakenburg until June 2021. In March 2021, he announced his retirement from football.

References

External links
 
 

1990 births
Sportspeople from Goes
Living people
Dutch footballers
R. Olympic Charleroi Châtelet Farciennes players
Dutch expatriate footballers
HSV Hoek players
SC Telstar players
Amsterdamsche FC players
SV Spakenburg players
Eerste Divisie players
Tweede Divisie players
Association football defenders
VV Kloetinge players
Dutch expatriate sportspeople in Belgium
Expatriate footballers in Belgium
VV Goes players
Footballers from Zeeland